Ashokapuram is a suburb of Mysore coming on the southern side of the city.  It is part of Mysore district in Karnataka state of India.

Landmarks
 Dr. Ambedkar Park, Ashokapuram
 Central Railway Workshop, Ashokapuram
 Ashokapuram Police Station
 Sandalwood Factory, Ashokapuram
 Hare Krishna temple (ISKCON)
 Mysore South Post Office
 Aranya Bhawan Forest Office

Transportation
From the Mysore city bus stand to Ashoka puram buses are available. Ashoka Clinic or Ashokapuram bus stop or Jayanagar Railway Gate stop. 

Nearby bus stops at Ashoka Circle (ballal). 

Ashokapuram Railway Station has slow trains to Chamaraja Nagar and Mysore. The nearest major station is Mysore Junction railway station.

Education
 National Institute of Engineering
 Maharishi School
 Pramati Hillview Academy
 NIE Science College
 St. Thomas School
St. Rita School 
Sarada Vilas Educational Institutions 
Government Schools

Suburbs
Devayyanahundi is the suburb of Ashokapuram on the southern side.  Srirampura watertank connects Ashokapuram to Kuvempu Nagar area. Bus No.60 touches Ashokapuram, Jayanagara Chamarajapuram and Watertank localities.

See also 
 Chamarajapuram
 Mysore South
 Gurur
 Vidyaranyapura, Mysore
 Jayaprakash Nagar Mysore
 Nanju Mallige
 Mananthavady Road

References

Mysore South
Suburbs of Mysore